Tuscumbia is a village in and the county seat of Miller County, Missouri, United States. The population was 203 at the 2010 census, at which time it was a town.

History
Tuscumbia was laid out in 1837. The community's name most likely is a transfer from Tuscumbia, Alabama.  A post office called Tuscumbia has been in operation since 1837.

Geography
Tuscumbia is located on the north bank of the Osage River near the junction of Missouri routes 17 and 52. Eldon is approximately 9.5 miles to the northwest and the Lake of the Ozarks dam is 8.5 miles to the west.

Demographics

2010 census
As of the census of 2010, there were 203 people, 55 households, and 38 families living in the village. The racial makeup of the village was 93.6% White, 3.9% African American, 2.0% Native American, and 0.5% from other races. Hispanic or Latino of any race were 5.9% of the population.

There were 55 households, of which 34.5% had children under the age of 18 living with them, 47.3% were married couples living together, 12.7% had a female householder with no husband present, 9.1% had a male householder with no wife present, and 30.9% were non-families. 25.5% of all households were made up of individuals, and 9.1% had someone living alone who was 65 years of age or older. The average household size was 2.56 and the average family size was 2.97.

The median age in the village was 36.7 years. 18.2% of residents were under the age of 18; 11.3% were between the ages of 18 and 24; 36.1% were from 25 to 44; 28.1% were from 45 to 64; and 6.4% were 65 years of age or older. The gender makeup of the village was 65.0% male and 35.0% female.

2000 census
As of the census of 2000, there were 218 people, 57 households, and 40 families living in the town. The population density was 617.2 people per square mile (240.5/km). There were 72 housing units at an average density of 203.9 per square mile (79.4/km). The racial makeup of the town was 95.41% White, 1.83% African American, 0.46% Native American, 0.92% Asian, and 1.38% from two or more races. Hispanic or Latino of any race were 1.38% of the population.

There were 57 households, out of which 29.8% had children under the age of 18 living with them, 54.4% were married couples living together, 14.0% had a female householder with no husband present, and 28.1% were non-families. 24.6% of all households were made up of individuals, and 15.8% had someone living alone who was 65 years of age or older. The average household size was 2.35 and the average family size was 2.68.

In the town the population was spread out, with 15.1% under the age of 18, 20.2% from 18 to 24, 31.7% from 25 to 44, 22.5% from 45 to 64, and 10.6% who were 65 years of age or older. The median age was 35 years. For every 100 females, there were 159.5 males. For every 100 females age 18 and over, there were 156.9 males.

The median income for a household in the town was $19,375, and the median income for a family was $26,875. Males had a median income of $15,341 versus $16,000 for females. The per capita income for the town was $8,117. About 12.0% of families and 19.3% of the population were below the poverty line, including 35.7% of those under the age of eighteen and 36.8% of those 65 or over.

Notable people 

 Derrick Helton (born 1985), Paralympic wheelchair rugby player 
 Alex White (born 1988), featherweight mixed martial artist competing in the UFC 
 Ina Phillips Williams (1876 – 1934), early female legislator in Washington State, was born in Tuscumbia
 Don Woody (born 1937), rockabilly drummer and comedian, was born in Tuscumbia

References

External links
 History of Tuscumbia, Miller County Museum and Historical Society

Villages in Miller County, Missouri
County seats in Missouri
Villages in Missouri